California Heights is a historic neighborhood of Long Beach, California.

Location
California Heights is located north of Signal Hill, east of Los Cerritos, south of North Long Beach and Bixby Knolls, and west of Long Beach Airport. Shops and restaurants are conveniently located on Atlantic Avenue, which runs through the district.

Description
Until the early 1920s California Heights was part of the Bixby Ranch (now Rancho Los Cerritos) and was used primarily as grazing land. It was the discovery of oil on Signal Hill and the ensuing land boom in 1921 that caused the Jotham Bixby Company to subdivide and sell off lots in the California Heights tract.

In 1927, California Heights included Chateau Thierry (the subdivision on the west side of California Avenue) and petitioned the City of Long Beach for paved streets, sidewalks, curbs and ornamental lighting.

The California Heights-Chateau Thierry area grew rapidly, with approximately 250 families moving into the neighborhood between 1925 and 1927. The area continued to attract new families, and by 1939 most of the building was complete.

Architecture
The district consists of approximately 1,500 homes. The predominant architectural style is Spanish Colonial Revival. Craftsman bungalows and Tudor Revival styles can also be found.

See also
Neighborhoods of Long Beach, California

External links
California Heights Neighborhood Association
Long Beach Historic District
California Heights Historic District Video Homes Tour

References

Neighborhoods in Long Beach, California
Populated places established in 1921